In enzymology, an indoleacetylglucose-inositol O-acyltransferase is an enzyme that catalyzes the chemical reaction

1-O-(indol-3-yl)acetyl-beta-D-glucose + myo-inositol  D-glucose + O-(indol-3-yl)acetyl-myo-inositol

Thus, the two substrates of this enzyme are 1-O-(indol-3-yl)acetyl-beta-D-glucose and myo-inositol, whereas its two products are D-glucose and O-(indol-3-yl)acetyl-myo-inositol.

This enzyme belongs to the family of transferases, specifically those acyltransferases transferring groups other than aminoacyl groups.  The systematic name of this enzyme class is 1-O-(indol-3-yl)acetyl-beta-D-glucose:myo-inositol (indol-3-yl)acetyltransferase. Other names in common use include indole-3-acetyl-beta-1-D-glucoside:myo-inositol, indoleacetyltransferase, 1-O-(indol-3-ylacetyl)-beta-D-glucose:myo-inositol, and indole-3-ylacetyltransferase.

References

 
 

EC 2.3.1
Enzymes of unknown structure